Square engine may refer to:

 a square four engine, a U engine in which two parallel-twin engines are coupled together
 an engine with a stroke ratio of 1 (+/- 5%); see Stroke ratio#Square engine